The Laško subdialect (laški govor) is a Slovene subdialect in the Styrian dialect group. It is a subdialect of the Lower Sava Valley dialect, extending from east of Zidani Most nearly to Jurklošter, and in the areas of Rimske Toplice and Laško.

Phonological and morphological characteristics
The Laško subdialect exhibits strong Styrian features. The subdialect is characterized by loss of pitch accent, development of close diphthongal ie from old acute nasal *ę and neoacute etymological e and close diphthongal uo from old long and old acute nasal *ǫ and neoacute etymological o. Masculine genitive -ov has developed into -u, as has the neuter nominative adjectival ending -o. The vowel a has developed a ə-like character in prepositions and prefixes derived from prepositions. Final -o and -e in neuter nouns has been lost, transforming these into masculine nouns that now follow the masculine declension pattern. The cluster šč has been reduced to š and homorganic dental clusters have dissimilated to velar-dental clusters (e.g., dn > gn, tl > kl). Morphologically, there has been contamination between present-tense verbs in -im and -em.

References

Slovene dialects in Styria (Slovenia)